Kweku George Ricketts-Hagan is a Ghanaian politician and member of the Seventh Parliament of the Fourth Republic of Ghana representing the Cape Coast South Constituency in the Central Region on the ticket of the National Democratic Congress.

Early life and education 
Ricketts-Hagan was born on 21 August 1963 in Cape Coast in the Central Region of Ghana. He holds an MBA from the University of Chicago Business School and a master's degree in Financial Economics from the University of London.

Career 
Ricketts-Hagan was the managing director of SAS Finance Group.

Politics 
Ricketts-Hagan is a member of the National Democratic Congress. He is currently the member of parliament representative for the Cape Coast South Constituency.

2016 elections 
In the 2016 Ghanaian general elections, he won the Cape Coast South Constituency parliamentary seat with 20,456 votes making 49.8% of the total votes cast whilst the NPP parliamentary candidate Michael Arthur Dadzie had 19,718 votes making 48.0% of the total votes cast, the PPP parliamentary candidate Bright Edem Droefenu had 606 votes making 1.5% of the total votes cast, an Independent parliamentary candidate Mr. Albert Isaac Kofi Cobbinah had 203 votes making 0.5% of the total votes cast and the CPP parliamentary candidate Ato Aidoo-Nyanor had 78 votes making 0.2% of the total votes cast.

2020 elections 
In the 2016 Ghanaian general elections, he again won the Cape Coast South Constituency parliamentary seat with 21,118 votes making 51.7% of the total votes cast whilst the NPP parliamentary candidate Ernest Arthur had 19,714 votes making 48.3% of the total votes cast.

Minister 
In 2016, Ricketts-Hagan became the minister of the Central Region of Ghana. He served in the Government of Ghana ministry as the deputy minister for Finance from 2013 to 2014 and the deputy minister for Trade and Industries from 2014 to 2016.

Committees 
Ricketts-Hagan is a Ranking Member of the Privileges Committee, also a member of the Gender and Children Committee and also a member of the Trade, Industry and Tourism Committee.

Personal life 
Ricketts-Hagan is a Christian. He is married with five children.

Controversy 
In October 2021, Ricketts-Hagan was sued by Mr. Ernest Arthur who was the Metropolitan Chief Executive for Cape Coast for his defamatory comments made against him. Ricketts-Hagan was asked by the Cape Coast High Court to retract and apologize to Mr. Arthur. Ricketts-Hagan was also charged GH¢100,000.

References 

Ghanaian MPs 2017–2021
1963 births
Living people
National Democratic Congress (Ghana) politicians
Alumni of the University of London
Ghanaian MPs 2021–2025